is a railway station in Toyonaka, Osaka Prefecture, Japan, on the Hankyu Takarazuka Line operated by the Hankyu Railway.

Lines
Hankyu Takarazuka Line

Since the 1970s there have been plans to build a line to Itami Airport from Sone, which would allow through service between the airport and Umeda. Although Hankyu shelved the plans in the 1980s due to capacity constraints, the plans were reportedly revived in 2017 and remain under consideration as of 2018. The Itami Airport terminal is approx. 4 km from Sone.

Layout
2 island platforms sieving 2 tracks each are located on the second level. A storage track is located between through tracks in the north of the platforms connecting Tracks 2, 3 and 4.

Adjacent stations

See also
List of railway stations in Japan

References

External links
Sone (Hankyu Railway) 

Railway stations in Osaka Prefecture
Hankyu Railway Takarazuka Line
Stations of Hankyu Railway
Railway stations in Japan opened in 1912